CGIS may refer to:

 Canada Geographic Information System, a system designed to assist in regulatory procedures of land-use management and resource monitoring
 Coast Guard Investigative Service, a division of the United States Coast Guard that investigates crimes where the Coast Guard has an interest